Shaul Rosolio (1923–1992) was the 5th Israeli Police Commissioner. He held this post from 1972 to 1977.

Biography
Rosolio was born in 1923 in Tel Aviv. Rosolio's brother Daniel later became a Knesset member. He is buried on Mount Herzl in Jerusalem.

Police career
At age 19 Rosolio enlisted and served as a guard in 1946. During the 1947–1949 Palestine war he helped build a training program for the Israel Police. Rosolio enlisted with the rank of inspector. He served at the national headquarters and in 1951 he was appointed commander of the police training base. In 1956 he was appointed deputy commander of the District. Later he became deputy commander of the Jerusalem district. 

In 1960 he was responsible for the place of imprisonment of Adolf Eichmann. From 1962 to 1970 was commander of the Southern District. From 1970 - 1972 he was chief of the police organization. On 1 August 1972 he was appointed assistant chief, and after the death of commissioner Aaron Rock, Rosolio was appointed commissioner on November 1.

Diplomatic career
On 30 December 1977 he retired as Israeli ambassador to Mexico.

References 

1923 births
1992 deaths
Israel Police
Burials at Mount Herzl